Pürevdorjiin Enkhbileg (born 8 February 1996) is a Mongolian footballer who plays as a forward for Mongolian Premier League club Anduud City and the Mongolian national team.

Club career
Enkhbileg has played for Anduud City of the Mongolian Premier League since 2016. During the club's first season in the top division in 2017, Purevdorj was ranked ninth in the league with seven goals in 18 matches. He was named the Premier League ‘’Forward of the Month’’ for September 2017. He also won the "Goal of the Season" award at the Mongolian Football Federation's annual Golden Ball awards. Purevdorj scored more goals than any other player in the Premier League from outside of the box, with one of those strikes winning the award.

International career
Enkhbileg appeared for Mongolia in 2018 AFC U-23 Championship qualification, including in a match against Malaysia in which he was threatening in the opponents' half. In December 2017 he was again called up to the under-23 team to compete in the 2017 Aceh World Solidarity Tsunami Cup in Indonesia.

He made his senior international debut on 5 October 2017 coming on as a substitute in a 2–4 friendly defeat to Chinese Taipei on 5 October 2017. He scored his first goal for Mongolia in its next match, and just his second cap and first start, in a friendly match away at Malaysia on 22 March 2018.

International goals
Score and result list Mongolia's goal tally first.

International statistics

References

External links
Mongolian Football Federation profile
Soccerway profile
National football teams profile

1996 births
Living people
Mongolian footballers
Association football forwards
Mongolia international footballers
Anduud City FC players
Mongolian National Premier League players